Grover M. Hudson (born 1940) is an American linguist and Professor Emeritus of Linguistics, Germanic, Slavic, Asian and African Languages at Michigan State University.
He is known for his works on the Amharic language.

Works
 Essays on Gurage language and culture : dedicated to Wolf Leslau on the occasion of his 90th birthday, 1996
 Cushitic Lexicon and Phonology. ed. Grover Hudson. (Schriften zur Afrikanistik / Research in African Studies, 28). Berlin: Peter Lang. 
 Essential introductory linguistics, 1999
 Anbessa Teferra and Grover Hudson (2007). Essentials of Amharic. Cologne: Rüdiger Köppe Verlag.
 Ethiopian Semitic archaic heterogeneity
 Ethiopian Semitic negative nonpast
 Ethiopian Semitic Overview
 Ethiopic Documents: Argobba Grammar and Dictionary
 Geoloinguistic evidence for Ethiopian semitic prehistory
 Gurage Studies: Collected Articles
 
 History of the people of Ethiopia
 Linguistics and the university education, 1980
 New trends in Ethiopian studies : Ethiopia 94 : papers of the 12th International Conference of Ethiopian Studies, Michigan State University, 5-10 September 1994
 Northeast African semitic lexical comparisons and analysis
 Paradigmatic Initiation of a Sound Change in Hadiyya
 Phonology of Ethiopian languages
 The Principled Grammar of Amharic Verb Stems
 The Role of SPCs in Natural Generative Phonology
 Suppletion in the representation of alternations, 1975
 Why Amharic is not a VSO language

References

1940 births
Living people
Linguists from the United States
Michigan State University faculty
University of California, Los Angeles alumni
American phonologists